Chebogue (formerly spelled Jebogue) is a small fishing village situated above the marshes of the Chebogue River in Yarmouth County, Nova Scotia. Farming and fishing are the two main resources in the area.

History
The Mi'kmaq gave it its name which means "big marshes" because of the 343 hectares (837 acres) of salt marshland along the Chebogue River beginning at Arcadia. Other meanings for the area of Chebogue include "large tranquil river" and "narrow passage". Mi'kmaq stone tools were found nearby, dating from 5000 to 7000 years ago.

Chebogue's known European history began in 1614 with the establishment of a permanent Acadian settlement. However the French explorer Samuel de Champlain, on a map dated 1607, has drawn buildings on both sides of a river which is probably the Chebogue River. That would make Chebogue the third oldest European settlement in Canada after Sainte-Croix in 1604 and Port Royal, Nova Scotia in 1605.

An habitation or fort and trading post was built here by David Lomeron, a merchant from La Rochelle, France. It was however destroyed by the Kirke brothers in 1628. Chebogue was also referred to as Port Lomeron and Fort Lomeron in some accounts of the time.

The Acadian community of Chebogue received an influx of settlers in 1740. A chapel, Sainte-Anne, was constructed on Durkee Island. It was one of the most important Acadian communities in south western Nova Scotia at the time. However, in 1758 the entire settlement was destroyed and the Acadian inhabitants deported.

In 1761, English settlers from New England, called Planters, landed at Chebogue. They consisted of Captain Moses Perry, Ebenezer Ellis and Sealed Landers and their families. A plaque mounted besides the cemetery gate at Town Point in Chebogue commemorates this event.

Another prominent initial settler was Ephraim Cook (mariner).

During the American Revolution, during the Battle off Yarmouth (1777), the British Navy drove an American Privateer ashore near Chebogue River, where the prisoners escaped into the village.

Present day

Today Chebogue's main economy is still based on farming and fishing, the same as almost 400 years ago.

References

General Service Areas in Nova Scotia
Communities in Yarmouth County